The crest-tailed mulgara (Dasycercus cristicauda), is a small to medium-sized Australian carnivorous marsupial and a member of the family Dasyuridae (meaning "hairy tail") which includes quolls, dunnarts, the numbat, Tasmanian devil and extinct thylacine.  The crest-tailed mulgara is among a group of native predatory mammals or mesopredators endemic to arid Australia.

Description 
The crest-tailed mulgara is a small to medium-sized mammal with sandy coloured fur on the upper parts leading to a darker grey on the under parts and inner limbs. The species is strongly sexually dimorphic with adult males weighing  and females weighing .  Head-body length of 125–230 mm and tail length is between 75–125 mm. Identification between the two species within the genus Dasycercus has proven difficult with the crest-tailed mulgara (Dasycercus cristicauda) often confused with the brush-tailed mulgara or ampurta (D. blythi).  Tail morphology is a primary identifying feature between the two species. The crest-tailed mulgara has a crest of fine black hairs along the dorsal edge of the tail creating a fin-like crest and hair length tapering towards the tip. In contrast the brush-tailed mulgara tail hair is not crested, black hair starts half way along the upper surface of the tail and dorsal hair length remains consistent. Nipple count also differs between the two species and is another distinguishing feature. The female crest-tailed mulgara has eight nipples compared to the brush-tailed mulgara who only has six.

Taxonomy 
There has been taxonomic confusion within the genus Dasycercus described by Peters in 1875.  Four named forms of carnivorous marsupials have been assigned to this genus. Kreft, 1867, first described Chaetocercus cristicauda in 1877. A second form, Phascogale blythi was described by Waite, 1904, followed by a third form, Phascogale hillieri described by Thomas, 1905. Jones 1923, described two species of mulgara Dasycercus cristicauda and D. hillieri. but decades on, William Ride’s 'A Guide to the Native Mammals of Australia' published in 1970 referred only to a single species, Dasycercus cristicauda, and in 1988 Mahoney and Ride placed all three species in the synonymy of D. cristicauda. A fourth species, Dasyuroides byrnei, described by Spencer, 1896, was included by Mahoney and Ride however a lack of consensus resulted in its exclusion to the genus Dasycercus. In 1995 Woolley described two sub-species, D. cristicauda cristicauda and D. cristicauda hillieri, which were later confirmed to be two species using mitochondrial gene sequencing by Adams, Cooper and Armstrong in 2000.  Woolley resolved the taxonomic and nomenclatural issues in 2005 and the species was re-named to two genetically distinct forms, D. cristicauda previously D. hillieri or the Ampurta and D. blythi previously named D. cristicauda or the Mulgara.

Distribution 
The crest-tailed mulgara inhabits areas of arid Australia. It has been recorded in the southern Simpson Desert near the tri-state border and in the Tirari and Strzelecki Deserts of South Australia and the western Lake Eyre region. Historically the species’ geographic range was much larger incorporating areas from Ooldea on the eastern edge of the Nullarbor Plain and the Musgrave Ranges in South Australia, Sandringham Station in Queensland (last record in 1968) and from the Canning Stock Route and near Rawlinna on the Nullarbor Plain in Western Australia. Owl pellet examinations showed presence of crest-tailed mulgara near the southern and south-eastern margins of the Strzelecki dunefield/sandplain, in the Flinders Ranges and at Mutawintji National Park in far-western New South Wales. Due to the levels of taxonomic uncertainty, misidentification may have led to an overestimated distribution especially when based on older records. This has created difficulties in assessing and interpreting temporal changes within its historic distribution.

Ecology and habitat

Habitat 
The crest-tailed mulgara inhabits crests and slopes of sand ridges, or around salt lakes in inland Australia. During the day it shelters in burrows which are located at the base of sandhill canegrass (Zygochloa paradoxa) clumps or Nitre bush (Nitraria billardieri) growing around the edges of salt lakes.  Burrow site suitability, rainfall, food resources and the fire age of the vegetation community may be a factor influencing their distribution.

Diet 
The crest-tail mulgara is an opportunistic or non-specialist carnivore, eating a range of insects, arachnids and rodents but also includes reptiles, centipedes and small marsupials. It forages along the dune crests and flanks with forays down onto the swales.

Breeding and reproduction 
The crest-tailed mulgara reaches sexual maturity in the first year. Reproduction occurs between winter and early summer raising up to eight young in a litter. Independent young are found in spring and early summer

Conservation status 

The following are the federal, state and international listings for the crest-tailed mulgara. The mulgara was presumed extirpated in New South Wales for more than a century, but was re-discovered in 2017 in Sturt National Park north-west of Tibooburra.

Federal Listing Status 
Under the Environment Protection and Biodiversity Conservation Act 1999 (the EPBC Act): Listed as Vulnerable.

Non-statutory Listing Status         
IUCN: Listed as Near Threatened (Global Status: IUCN Red List of Threatened Species).

WA: Listed as P4 (Priority Flora and Priority Fauna List (Western Australia)).

NGO: Listed as Near Threatened (The Action Plan for Australian Mammals 2012).

State Listing Status 
NSW: Listed as Extinct (Biodiversity Conservation Act 2016), April 2018.

NT: Listed as Vulnerable (Territory Parks and Wildlife Conservation Act 2000), 2012.

QLD: Listed as Vulnerable (Nature Conservation Act 1992), September 2017.

SA: Listed as Endangered (National Parks and Wildlife Act 1972), June 2011.

Threats 
The crest-tailed mulgara is sensitive to predation by the European red fox and feral cat, changes to fire regimes together with environmental degradation and habitat homogenization attributed to grazing from livestock and introduced European rabbits. During post-release of rabbit hemorrhagic disease virus (RHDV), the crest-tailed mulgara underwent a 70-fold increase in its extent of occurrence and a 20-fold increase in its area of occupancy.

References

External links

Dasyuromorphs
Mammals of the Northern Territory
Mammals of South Australia
Mammals of Western Australia
Mammals of New South Wales
Marsupials of Australia
Vulnerable fauna of Australia
Mammals described in 1867
Extant Oligocene first appearances